Sergio Kerusch (born January 6, 1989) is an American professional basketball player who currently plays for Mitteldeutscher BC of the Basketball Bundesliga. He is a 6 ft 5 in (1.96 m) tall shooting guard-small forward. He also holds a German passport due to his German father.

College career
After playing basketball at Overton High School, Kerusch played college basketball at Itawamba Community College (2007–08), and at Western Kentucky University, with the Western Kentucky Hilltoppers, from 2008-11.

Pro career
Kerusch began his professional basketball career after signing a contract with the Greek Championship club Aris Thessaloniki in 2011. In June 2012 he left Aris Thessaloniki and signed with Artland Dragons. On February 20, he signed with Eisbären Bremerhaven of the Basketball Bundesliga.

After playing for Mitteldeutscher BC from 2016-2023, he signed with Medipolis SC Jena of the ProA on February 1, 2023.

References

External links
Eurocup Profile
Eurobasket.com Profile
Western Kentucky Hilltoppers College Profile

1989 births
Living people
American expatriate basketball people in Greece
American men's basketball players
American people of German descent
Aris B.C. players
Artland Dragons players
Basketball players from Memphis, Tennessee
Eisbären Bremerhaven players
German men's basketball players
Greek Basket League players
Junior college men's basketball players in the United States
Mitteldeutscher BC players
Shooting guards
Small forwards
Western Kentucky Hilltoppers basketball players